Eremophila anomala, commonly known as Paroo poverty bush, is a plant in the figwort family, Scrophulariaceae and is endemic to two small areas in central Western Australia. It occurs with other species of Eremophila growing in clay loam on basalt outcrops near Paroo.

Description
They are elliptic to egg-shaped and are mostly glabrous except near the base and along the edges.

There are 5 petals joined at their bases to form a tube. The inside of the tube is hairy and the outside is covered with glandular hairs. There are four stamens which are shorter than the tube.

Taxonomy and naming
The species was first formally described by Robert Chinnock in 2007 and the description was published in Eremophila and allied genera : a monograph of the plant family Myoporaceae. The specific epithet (anomala) is a Latin word meaning "anomalous" or "abnormal", referring to the fact that this species lacks the white tomentum on vegetative parts characteristic of section Eriocalyx.

Distribution and habitat
Eremophila anomala is only known from two populations growing in a small area north of Paroo station in the Murchison biogeographic region. It grows in mulga woodland in association with other eremophilas in clay loam on basalt outcrops.

Conservation status
Eremophila anomala is classified as "Priority One" by the Government of Western Australia Department of Parks and Wildlife meaning that it is known from only one or a few locations which are potentially at risk.

References

anomala
Eudicots of Western Australia
Plants described in 2007
Endemic flora of Western Australia
annosocaulis